Ben Johnson: Third Cowboy on the Right is a 1996 documentary film about the life of actor Ben Johnson.  The film was directed by Tom Thurman and written by Thurman and Tom Marksbury.

External links
Ben Johnson: Third Cowboy on the Right at the Internet Movie Database

1996 films
American documentary films
Documentary films about actors
1996 documentary films
1990s English-language films
1990s American films